Free school may refer to:

Education
 A school that provides free education, not charging for attendance
 Free school (England), a type of publicly financed but independently run school in England since 2011
 Free school movement, an American education reform movement during the 1960s and 1970s that sought to change the aims of formal schooling through alternative, independent community schools
 Free skool, an autonomous, nonhierarchical space intended for educational exchange and skillsharing, especially among anarchists
 A term for independent schools in certain countries, such as Swedish free schools

See also
 Democratic education, schooling run as direct democracies
 List of democratic schools, in which students have the freedom to design their own curriculum and participate in running the school
 London Free School, a counterculture community school of UK Underground also involved with the creation of the Notting Hill Carnival
 Free School of Evanston, a school in Evanston, Illinois, US
 Freedom School, an American libertarian school in the 20th century
 Freedom Schools, temporary, alternative free schools for American Southern blacks during the 1964 Freedom Summer
 Jean-Baptiste (songwriter), also known as Free School